Meena Keshwar Kamal (Pashto/; 27 February 1956 – 4 February 1987), commonly known as Meena, was an Afghan revolutionary political activist, feminist, women's rights activist and founder of Revolutionary Association of the Women of Afghanistan (RAWA), who was assassinated in 1987.

Biography

In 1977, when she was a student at Kabul University, she founded Revolutionary Association of the Women of Afghanistan (RAWA), an organization formed to promote equality and education for women and continues to "give voice to the deprived and silenced women of Afghanistan". Despite the Saur Revolution and women's rights placed high on the Democratic Republic's agenda, Kamal felt that there was no vast changes of women's deprivation in Afghanistan. In 1979 she campaigned against government, and organized meetings in schools to mobilize support against it, and in 1981, she launched a bilingual feminist magazine, Payam-e-Zan (Women's Message). She also founded Watan Schools to aid refugee children and their mothers, offering both hospitalization and the teaching of practical skills.

At the end of 1981, by invitation of the French Government, Meena represented the Afghan resistance movement at the French Socialist Party Congress. The Soviet delegation at the Congress, headed by Boris Ponamaryev, left the hall as participants cheered when Meena started waving a victory sign. She would eventually move and base her RAWA organization in Quetta, Pakistan, in opposition to the Afghan Marxist government.

Personal life 

Kamal was married to Afghanistan Liberation Organization leader Faiz Ahmad, who was murdered by agents of Gulbuddin Hekmatyar on 12 November 1986. Meena was executed less than 3 months afterwards. They had three children, whose whereabouts are unknown.

Assassination

Kamal was assassinated in Quetta, Pakistan on 4 February 1987. Reports vary as to who the assassins were, but are believed to have been agents of the Afghan Intelligence Service KHAD, the Afghan secret police, or of fundamentalist Mujahideen leader Gulbuddin Hekmatyar. In May 2002, two men were hanged in Pakistan after being convicted of Kamal's murder.

Legacy 

In a special issue of Time magazine on 13 November 2006, included Meena among "60 Asian Heroes" and wrote that "Although she was only 30 when she died, Meena had already planted the seeds of an Afghan women's rights movement based on the power of knowledge."

RAWA says of her "Meena gave 12 years of her short but brilliant life to struggle for her homeland and her people. She had a strong belief that despite the darkness of illiteracy, ignorance of fundamentalism, and corruption and decadence of sell outs imposed on our women under the name of freedom and equality, finally that half of population will be awaken and cross the path towards freedom, democracy and women's rights. The enemy was rightly shivering with fear by the love and respect that Meena was creating within the hearts of our people. They knew that within the fire of her fights all the enemies of freedom, democracy and women would be turned to ashes."

An enduring quote from Meena states:

See also

Revolutionary Association of the Women of Afghanistan
Taliban treatment of women

Further reading
 Meena - Heroine of Afghanistan, (2003) book by Melody Ermachild Chavis .

References

External links

RAWA's biography of Meena
Meena, an inspiration (Time Magazine, November 13, 2006)
More photos
Full text of Meena's Poem "I'll Never Return"
A song by Korean singer Hae Kyoung Ahn based on Meena's above poem
A Biography

1956 births
1987 deaths
Afghan democracy activists
Afghan feminists
Afghan people murdered abroad
Assassinated activists
Assassinated Afghan people
Civil rights activists
People murdered in Balochistan, Pakistan
Afghan secularists
Afghan revolutionaries
Afghan expatriates in Pakistan
Magazine founders
Female revolutionaries